VMX may refer to:

Computing
 Virtual Machine Extensions, instructions on processors with x86 virtualization
 AltiVec, a floating point and integer SIMD instruction set called VMX by IBM
 vMX 3D, an Ethernet router in the Juniper MX-Series by Juniper Networks
 .vmx, a filename extension for virtual machine configuration files used by VMware

Other uses
 Vintage motocross
 VMX (TalkTalk), an on-demand music television service
 VMX (Voice Message Exchange), a voicemail company